Thomas Dean Pollard (born July 7, 1942) is a prominent educator, cell biologist and biophysicist whose research focuses on understanding cell motility through the study of actin filaments and myosin motors. He is Sterling Professor of Molecular, Cellular & Developmental Biology and a Professor of Cell Biology and Molecular Biophysics & Biochemistry at Yale University. He was Dean of Yale's Graduate School of Arts and Sciences from 2010 to 2014, and President of the Salk Institute for Biological Studies from 1996 to 2001.

Education
He was educated at Pomona College, receiving a B.A. degree in 1964.

He then attended Harvard Medical School, graduating cum laude in 1968. He then interned at Massachusetts General Hospital and began his career as a physician.

Career
Following his internship, Pollard became a Staff Associate at the National Heart and Lung Institute. Soon after, he returned to Harvard, becoming an Assistant Professor of Anatomy in 1972, and advancing to Associate Professor in 1975. In 1977, Pollard was named Professor and Chairman of the Department of Cell Biology and Anatomy at Johns Hopkins University School of Medicine, where his laboratory discovered and characterized several important cellular proteins. In 1996, he left Hopkins to become the President of the Salk Institute for Biological Studies in La Jolla, CA, where he also maintained a highly productive research unit in the Structural Biology Laboratory. Additionally, Pollard served as an Adjunct Professor of Biology, of Bioengineering, and of Chemistry and Biochemistry at the University of California, San Diego. In 2001, Pollard began moving his laboratory to Yale, where he is currently the Sterling Professor and Chair of the Department of Molecular, Cellular & Developmental Biology and Professor of Cell Biology and Molecular Biophysics & Biochemistry. In 2010, President Richard Levin named Pollard Dean of the Graduate School of Arts and Sciences at Yale. Pollard has been very active in promoting scientific education and research primarily through two major societies, both of which he served as a past President: the American Society for Cell Biology and the Biophysical Society.

Нe is a member of the Editorial Board for Current Biology.

Pollard is a Fellow of the:
American Academy of Arts and Sciences (1990)
National Academy of Sciences of the United States (1992)
American Association for the Advancement of Science (1993)
American Academy of Microbiology (1997)
Biophysical Society (1999)
Institute of Medicine (1999)
American Society for Cell Biology (2016)

Pollard is a recipient of the:
Rosenstiel Award, Brandeis University (jointly with James Spudich in 1996)
Public Service Award, Biophysical Society (1997)
E.B. Wilson Medal, American Society for Cell Biology (2004)
Gairdner International Award in Biomedical Sciences (2006).
NAS Award for Scientific Reviewing (2015)

Along with co-authors William C. Earnshaw, PhD, FRSE; Jennifer Lippincott-Schwartz, PhD; and illustrator Graham Johnson, Pollard is the primary author of the textbook Cell Biology now in its second edition published by Saunders (2007). Numerous publications, teaching and public service awards, scientists mentored, and editorial boards served-on exemplify Pollard's tremendous contributions to the fields of education and cell biology.

Family
Thomas Pollard is married to Patricia Snowden and they have two children.  Katherine Snowden Pollard is Director of the Gladstone Institute of Data Science and Biotechnology and a Sloan Research Fellow at the University of California, San Francisco. Daniel Avery Pollard is an Assistant Professor in the Biology Department of Western Washington University.

References

External links
Yale University, Pollard Laboratory
The Gairdner Foundation, Thomas D. Pollard
Thomas D. Pollard CV

1942 births
Members of the United States National Academy of Sciences
Yale University faculty
Harvard Medical School alumni
Living people
Yale Sterling Professors
Pomona College alumni
Salk Institute for Biological Studies people
Presidents of the Biophysical Society
Members of the National Academy of Medicine